Norfolk & Western 2156 is a four-cylinder compound articulated class "Y6a" "Mallet" type steam locomotive with a 2-8-8-2 (Whyte notation) wheel arrangement. The Norfolk & Western Railway built it in 1942 at its Roanoke Shops in Roanoke, Virginia as a member of the N&W's Y6a class. It is the strongest-pulling extant steam locomotive in the world, although it is not operational. It was retired from regular rail service in July 1959 and is now owned by the National Museum of Transportation in St. Louis, Missouri.

In 2014, the museum leased it for five years to the Virginia Museum of Transportation in Roanoke, Virginia. It was towed from St. Louis to Roanoke on May 10, 2015, and towed back to St. Louis on June 10, 2020.

History

Historic significance
Norfolk & Western 2156 is the sole survivor of the railroad's Y5, Y6, Y6a and Y6b classes (in final form referred to as the "Improved Y5/Y6 class"). These locomotives developed 152,206 pounds of tractive effort when built, with later modifications bringing them closer to 170,000 pounds. By comparison, the Union Pacific Big Boy locomotives developed  of tractive effort.

Steam versus diesel tests, upgrades, and controversies
Coal traffic was N&W's largest source of revenue, and it had arguably the most modern and efficient steam locomotives of any major U.S. railroad. Accordingly, N&W resisted conversion from coal-burning steam locomotives to oil-burning diesels longer than most. In 1952, N&W tested its A-class and Y6b-class locomotives against a four-unit Electro-Motive Division F7 diesel set. The tests indicated that fuel costs and similar items were roughly the same, and the test was considered a tie. However, diesels eventually won out for lower maintenance and other operational costs.

Retrospective analyses of these tests have led to suggestions that diesel locomotive builder EMD and N&W cheated in the competition by using locomotives with secret modifications unsuited for daily work. However, the greater weight of evidence and analysis indicates that N&W did not cheat on these tests, and that the only improvements were the ones N&W publicized and later incorporated into many locomotives. Also, the major participants in this debate all appear to agree that N&W did ultimately modify most of its Y5, Y6, Y6a, and Y6b locomotives (including N&W 2156) with a new "intercepting/reducing valve" and ballast on the front engine, which increased their tractive effort.

Operational history
Norfolk & Western used 2156 and the other Y6-class locomotives primarily for slower, heavy freight trains in the more mountainous districts in the Pocahontas, Radford and Shenandoah Divisions. They mostly hauled manifest freight and coal trains.

When diesel locomotives took over the mainline steam operations, the Y6-type locomotives spent their last two years mostly on mine and other coal-field runs.

In July 1959, N&W donated 2156 to the National Museum of Transportation.

Current status

The museum cosmetically restored the locomotive in 1985.

In 2014, the museum agreed to lease the locomotive to Norfolk Southern and the Virginia Museum of Transportation in Roanoke, Virginia, in return for an EMD FT B unit. On May 9–12, 2015, the locomotive was towed to its temporary home.

On May 31, 2015, 2156 was reunited with N&W Class A No. 1218 and the recently restored Class J No. 611 as N&W's "The Big Three".

On June 10, 2020, 2156 left the Virginia Museum of Transportation in Roanoke, VA to go back to the St. Louis Museum of Transportation. It arrived back at the St. Louis Museum of Transportation on June 15, 2020. The locomotive remains on static display in St. Louis as of 2021.

References

External links

On display at the Museum of Transportation, July 22, 2007, Tracy Bone's Railroad Picture Archives

Mallet locomotives
2-8-8-2 locomotives
Freight locomotives
Individual locomotives of the United States
2156
Compound locomotives
Standard gauge locomotives of the United States
Railway locomotives introduced in 1942
Preserved steam locomotives of Missouri